The 2019 Kentucky Attorney General election was conducted on November 5. Primary elections occurred on May 21, 2019. The general election was held on November 5, 2019. Incumbent Democratic Attorney General Andy Beshear declined to seek reelection to a second term to instead successfully run for Governor. Republican nominee Daniel Cameron won with 57.8% of the vote. He became the first Republican elected attorney general of Kentucky since Eldon S. Dummit in 1944, and the state's first black attorney general.

Democratic primary

Candidates

Declared
Greg Stumbo, former Attorney General of Kentucky and former Speaker of the Kentucky House of Representatives

Republican primary

Candidates

Declared
Daniel Cameron, attorney for Senator Mitch McConnell and former University of Louisville football player
Wil Schroder, member of the Kentucky Senate for the 24th District

Withdrawn
Whitney Westerfield, member of the Kentucky Senate for the 3rd District and candidate for Attorney General in 2015

Polling

Results

General election
The general election took place on November 5, 2019, following the May 21 primary elections.

Endorsements

Polling

Results

See also
2019 United States elections
2019 Kentucky elections
2019 Kentucky gubernatorial election

Notes
Partisan clients

References

External links
Official campaign websites
 Daniel Cameron (R) for Attorney General
 Greg Stumbo (D) for Attorney General 

November 2019 events in the United States
Attorney General
Kentucky
Kentucky Attorney General elections